Liberty and Nature: An Aristotelian Defense of Liberal Order is a 1991 political philosophy book by the philosophers Douglas B. Rasmussen and Douglas Den Uyl. Tom G. Palmer writes that Rasmussen and Den Uyl, who are influenced by Aristotle's Nicomachean Ethics, defend a version of "moral realism" and explore "the idea that rights are a requirement of the life of a living reasoning entity."

References

External links 
 Symposium: Liberty and Nature: An Aristotelian Defense of Liberal Order in Reason Papers archive.
 Richard Kraut review in Critical Review
 Liberty and Nature at the Library of Congress

1991 non-fiction books
American non-fiction books
Contemporary philosophical literature
English-language books
Philosophy books
Political philosophy literature
Works by Douglas B. Rasmussen
Works by Douglas Den Uyl